Oradour-sur-Glane was a commune in the Haute-Vienne department, New Aquitaine, west central France, as well as the name of the main village within the commune.

History

The original village was destroyed on 10 June 1944, four days after D-Day, when 643 of its inhabitants, including women and children, were massacred by a company of troops belonging to the 2nd SS Panzer Division Das Reich, a Waffen-SS unit of the military forces of Nazi Germany in World War II. A new village was built after the war on a nearby site, but on the orders of president Charles de Gaulle, the original has been maintained as a permanent memorial. The Centre de la mémoire d'Oradour museum is located beside the historic site.

Personalities linked to the commune
 Robert Hébras, born on 29 June 1925 in Oradour-sur-Glane; one of the six survivors of the Oradour-sur-Glane massacre on 10 June 1944.
 Jean-Claude Peyronnet, (1940–), French politician, creator of the Centre of the Memory of Oradour-sur-Glane.
 Sébastien Puygrenier began his football career at US Oradour-sur-Glane where his father and his uncles played.
 Didier Barbelivien, French singer-songwriter, pays tribute to Oradour in his song "Les amants d'Oradour".

Geography
The municipality borders with Javerdat, Cieux, Peyrilhac, Veyrac, Saint-Victurnien and Saint-Brice-sur-Vienne.

Demographics

Gallery

See also
 Lidice, Czech village destroyed by Nazi forces in 1942

References

Bibliography
Farmer, Sarah. Martyred Village: Commemorating the 1944 Massacre at Oradour-sur-Glane. University of California Press, 2000.
Fouché, Jean-Jacques. Massacre At Oradour: France, 1944; Coming To Grips With Terror, Northern Illinois University Press, 2004.
Penaud, Guy. La "Das Reich" 2e SS Panzer Division (Parcours de la division en France, 560 pp), Éditions de La Lauze/Périgueux. 

Communes of Haute-Vienne
Oradour-sur-Glane massacre
Razed cities